Spring steel is a name given to a wide range of steels used in the manufacture of different products, including swords, saw blades, springs and many more. These steels are generally low-alloy manganese, medium-carbon steel or high-carbon steel with a very high yield strength. This allows objects made of spring steel to return to their original shape despite significant deflection or twisting.

Grades

Many grades of steel can be hardened and tempered to increase elasticity and resist deformation; however, some steels are inherently more elastic than others:

Applications

 Applications include piano wire (also known as music wire) such as ASTM A228 (0.80–0.95% carbon), spring clamps, antennas, springs (e. g. vehicle coil springs or leaf springs), and s-tines.
 Spring steel is commonly used in the manufacture of swords with rounded edges for training or stage combat, as well as sharpened swords for collectors and live combat.
 Spring steel is one of the most popular materials used in the fabrication of lockpicks due to its pliability and resilience.
 Tubular spring steel is used in the landing gear of some small aircraft due to its ability to absorb the impact of landing.
 It is frequently used in the making of knives, machetes, and other edged tools.
 It is used in electrical fish tapes.
 It is used in binder clips.
Used extensively in shims due to its resistance to deformation in low thicknesses.

See also
 Martensite

References

Bibliography

Steels
Springs (mechanical)